Mount Sedgwick in New Mexico at  is the highest peak in the Zuni Mountains.

References

External links
Zuni Mountains, New Mexico Tourism Department

Cibola National Forest
Landforms of Cibola County, New Mexico
Mountains of New Mexico
Mountains of Cibola County, New Mexico